Christianity is the main religion in Panama, with Catholicism having the most adherents. The Constitution provides for freedom of religion, with some qualifications, and the Government generally respects this right in practice.  The US government reported that there were no reports of societal abuses or discrimination based on religious belief or practice in 2007.

An official survey carried out by the government estimated in 2020 that 80.6% of the population, or 3,549,150 people, identifies itself as Roman Catholic, and 10.4 percent as evangelical Protestant, or 1,009,740. The Jehovah's Witnesses were the third largest congregation comprising the 1.4% of the population, followed by the Adventist Church and the Church of Jesus Christ of Latter-day Saints with the 0.6%. There is a Buddhist (0.4% or 18,560) and a Jewish community (0.1% or 5,240) in the country. The Baháʼí Faith community of Panama is estimated at 2.00% of the national population, or about 60,000 including about 10% of the Guaymí population; the Baháʼís maintain one of the world's eight Baháʼí Houses of Worship in Panama.

Distribution

Catholics are found throughout the country and at all levels of society. Evangelical Christians also are dispersed geographically and are becoming more prominent in society. The mainstream Protestant denominations, which include Southern Baptist Convention and other Baptist congregations, United Methodist, Methodist Church of the Caribbean and the Americas, and Lutheran, derive their membership from the Antillean black and the expatriate communities, both of which are concentrated in Panamá and Colón Provinces. The Jewish community is centered largely in Panama City. Muslims live primarily in Panama City and Colon, with smaller concentrations in David and other provincial cities. The vast majority of Muslims are of Lebanese, Palestinian, or Indian descent.

The Church of Jesus Christ of Latter-day Saints (Mormons) claim more than 40,000 members. Smaller religious groups include Buddhists with between 15,000 and 20,000 members, Seventh-day Adventists, Jehovah's Witnesses, Episcopalians with between 7,000 and 10,000 members, Jewish and Muslim communities with approximately 10,000 members each, Hindus, and other Christians. Indigenous religions include Ibeorgun (among Kuna) and Mamatata (among Ngobe). There is also a small number of Rastafarians.

Historical Trends 
Sources: Based on Pew Center Research (including historical percentages of Catholicism), by ends-1900 there were 26,000 U.S American (more than half being Protestants) stablished for the Canal construction making the 9% in a total population of 290,000 (1911 Census)

See also
Christianity in Panama
Roman Catholicism in Panama
Baháʼí Faith in Panama
Islam in Panama
Hinduism in Panama
Freedom of religion in Panama

References

External links
Religious radiostations in Panama List with over 20 online broadcasting Panamanian radiostations
Segunda Encuesta Nacional de Hogares, Panama 2015 via WaybackMachine